Yekaterina Lavrentyeva (born 26 June 1981) is a Russian luger who has competed since the late 1990s. A natural track luger, she won eight medals at the FIL World Luge Natural Track Championships with three golds (Women's singles (Gold: 2000, 2005, 2007), four silvers (Women's singles: 2003, 2009, 2011; Mixed team: 2005), and two bronzes (Mixed team: 2009, 2011).

Lavrentyeva also won four medals in the women's singles event at the FIL European Luge Natural Track Championships with three golds (2004, 2008, 2010) and a silver in 2002.

References
FIL-Luge profile: Lavrentjeva, Ekaterina
Natural track European Championships results 1970-2006.
Natural track World Championships results: 1979-2007

External links

 

1981 births
Living people
Russian female lugers
People from Kandalaksha
Sportspeople from Murmansk Oblast